Charleroi is a city and a municipality of Wallonia, located in the province of Hainaut, Belgium. By 1 January 2008, the total population of Charleroi was 201,593. The inhabitants are called Carolorégiens or simply Carolos.

Geography

The municipality of Charleroi straddles both banks of the river Sambre in an area marked by industrial activities (coal mining and steel industry), which has been nicknamed the Pays Noir ("Black Country"), part of the larger sillon industriel. Even though most of the factories have closed since the 1950s, the landscape remains dotted with spoil tips and old industrial buildings.

The municipality comprises:
I. the central district of Charleroi

and the following former municipalities, now sections, merged into Charleroi in 1977:

II. Dampremy
III. Lodelinsart
IV. Gilly
V. Montignies-sur-Sambre
VI. Couillet
VII. Marcinelle
VIII. Mont-sur-Marchienne
IX. Marchienne-au-Pont
X. Monceau-sur-Sambre
XI. Goutroux
XII. Roux
XIII. Jumet
XIV. Gosselies
XV. Ransart

Neighboring municipalities:

 a. Les Bons Villers
 b. Fleurus
 c. Châtelet
 d. Gerpinnes
 e. Ham-sur-Heure-Nalinnes
 f. Montigny-le-Tilleul
 g. Fontaine-l'Évêque
 h. Courcelles
 i. Pont-à-Celles

Topography and hydrography 

The topography of Charleroi is influenced by the valley of the river Sambre, which flows from west to east before joining the Meuse at Namur. The Piéton river flows from north to south to join the Sambre at Dampremy. The Charleroi-Brussels canal is dug in the valley of this stream. The Eau d'Heure river comes from the south and also flows into the Sambre at Marchienne-au-Pont. About twenty streams run through the territory of the municipality.

The altitude ranges from 100 metres (Sambre and Piéton valleys) to over 220 metres at the Bois du Prince in Marcinelle. The level is 132 metres on the Place Charles II. The height of the slag heaps often exceeds 200 metres, the Saint-Charles slag heap in the Bois du Cazier reaches 241 metres.

Biodiversity 
The six slag heaps in the Pays Noir are reservoirs of biodiversity that should be preserved.

Like the calcareous grassland, the slag heaps are habitats created by human activity that are home to many very specific and often threatened animal and plant species. The rarity of these species depends on the rarity of the environment itself (the biotope). Biodiversity is also present in other environments: in a wasteland, a body of water, a meadow, etc. In terms of biodiversity, it is therefore preferable to maintain a mosaic of habitats, hence the interest in preserving different types of environments on the slag heaps.

The Viviers site, for example, is an old mining site located in the east of Charleroi (Gilly). This site has a small conical slag heap and large open areas consisting mainly of pioneer grassland and wasteland. It also includes a small body of water as well as temporary ponds, and some wooded areas on the western and northern edges. This particular biotope is of great biological interest and acts as a refuge for a diverse fauna. The vast reed bed surrounding the pond is home to the red warbler, a passerine bird specific to this type of vegetation. Several species of amphibians can be seen here, including a population of the natterjack toad, as well as certain insects, such as the magnificent blue-winged grasshopper.

The Martinet site, a former colliery on the boundary of the Monceau-sur-Sambre and Roux sections, is in the process of being rehabilitated and reallocated. Like the Viviers slag heap in Gilly, this vast site is of great biological interest.

Climate
Similar to the rest of Belgium Charleroi has an oceanic climate as a result of the Gulf Stream influence warming winters, while also moderating summer warmth in spite of its inland position.

History

The Charleroi area was already settled in the prehistoric period, with traces of metallurgical and commercial activities along the Sambre. Several public buildings, temples and villas were built in the area in the Roman period. Burial places, with jewels and weapons, have been found. The first written mention of a place called Charnoy dates from a 9th-century offering in the Lobbes abbey, which lists various neighboring towns and related tithe duties. During the Middle Ages, Charnoy was one of the many small hamlets in the area, with no more than about 50 inhabitants, part of the County of Namur.

Foundation
Spanish territorial losses in the 1659 Treaty of the Pyrenees left a gap between the key fortresses of Mons and Namur; to fill this, Francisco Castel Rodrigo, then Governor of the Spanish Netherlands, expropriated land around Charnoy to build a fortress near the Sambre. In September 1666, it was renamed Charle-roi, or King Charles, in honour of five-year-old Charles II of Spain; the chronogram FVNDATVR CAROLOREGIVM (MDCLVVVI) can be found in the register of the parish of Charnoy.

Construction had only just begun when the War of Devolution with France began in 1667, and the Spanish withdrew. France retained the town under the 1668 Treaty of Aix-la-Chapelle, and its fortifications were completed by Vauban. A bridge was built over the Sambre, connecting the Ville Haute and Ville Basse, with incentives offered to persuade people to settle there. The French relinquished control in 1678, and although it changed hands several times over the next 50 years, the town remained part of the Netherlands until the foundation of modern Belgium.

1666–1830

Shortly after its foundation, the new city was in turn besieged by the Dutch, ceded to the Spanish in 1678 (Treaty of Nijmegen), taken by the French in 1693, ceded again to the Spanish in 1698 (Treaty of Rijswijk), then taken by the French, the Dutch and the Austrians in 1714 (Treaty of Baden). The French Prince of Conti took the city again in 1745, but it was ceded back to Austria in 1748, beginning a period of prosperity under Joseph II. Glass, steel and coal industries, which had already sprung up a century earlier, could now flourish.

Trouble began again in 1790, the year of the civil uprising that eventually led to the United States of Belgium. The Austrians occupied the city, were forced out by the French after the Battle of Jemappes on 6 November 1792, and took it back again four months later. On 12 June 1794, the French revolutionary Army of Sambre-et-Meuse under the command of Jean-Baptiste Jourdan, invested Charleroi and won a decisive victory in the ensuing Battle of Fleurus. The city took the revolutionary name of Libre-sur-Sambre until 1800. After France's defeat in 1814, the whole area was annexed to the Netherlands, and new walls were built around the city. Napoleon stayed in Charleroi for a couple of days in June 1815, just before the Battle of Waterloo.

1830 to present

The Belgian Revolution of 1830 gave the area its freedom from the Netherlands and ushered in a new era of prosperity, still based mostly on glass, metallurgy and coal, hence the area's name, Pays Noir ("Black Country"). After the Industrial Revolution, Charleroi benefited from the increased use of coke in the metallurgical industry. People from across Europe were attracted by the economic opportunities, and the population grew rapidly.

Following the Industrial revolution in Wallonia, Charleroi from the 1850s–1860s became one of the most important places where labor strikes broke out. In 1886, 12 strikers were killed by the Belgian army in Roux. In the 1880s, miners in Hainaut were recruited by the Dominion Coal Company in Glace Bay, Nova Scotia. These miners were anxious to flee the repression following bloody strikes and riots in Liège and Charleroi during the Walloon Jacquerie of 1886. Walloon miners from Charleroi also emigrated to Alberta, Canada. The working men of Charleroi always played an important role in Belgian general strikes and particularly during the Belgian general strike of 1936, the general strike against Leopold III of Belgium, and the 1960–1961 winter general strike.

By 1871, the fortified walls around the city were completely torn down.

Heavy fighting took place during World War I due to the city's strategic location on the Sambre. The city was badly damaged with further destruction only being prevented by a treaty agreed with the German forces which required the payment of 10 million Belgian Francs, foodstuffs, vehicles and armaments. The magazine Spirou, which featured the popular cartoon characters Lucky Luke and the Smurfs, was launched by the publishing company Éditions Dupuis in 1938. After World War II, Charleroi witnessed a general decline of its heavy industry. Following the merger with several surrounding municipalities in 1977, the city  ranks as the largest city in Wallonia and the 4th largest in Belgium.

Logotype 

As part of the effort to improve its identity, the city adopted a new logo and graphic charter in early 2015, designed by the Brussels studio Pam and Jenny.

The crown of three triangles above the C has several meanings:

 The triangular shape evokes the slag heaps, yesterday black and today green, which symbolise the city's industrial past and its factories.
 It also recalls the crest of the cockerel designed by Pierre Paulus and symbol of Wallonia.
 The crown refers to King Charles II who gave his name to the city at the time of its foundation.
 The typography used is also very similar to that used in the logo of ACEC, a historic company founded, developed and finally closed down in Charleroi in 1989 after more than a century of existence.

Politics

The Socialist Party (Parti Socialiste or PS) has had a stronghold in Charleroi for some time. However, in October 2006, mayor Jacques Van Gompel of the PS was jailed on fraud and forgery charges. Léon Casaert, also of the PS, became the new mayor, elected by PS, MR and cdH majorities. The MR resigned from the coalition just before the 2007 general election, citing official charges of corruption leveled against a PS alderman in Charleroi. After the 2007 general election, the PS placed the Charleroi local party section under full supervision of Paul Magnette, with the city executive resigning. Mayor Casaert was charged with fraud on 18 June 2007, but would only step down after a new city executive had been formed.

In April 2010, the director of technical services of Charleroi, Henri Stassens, was convicted in court of fraud and corruption.

Municipal elections

 (*)Under the local list name "C+" 
 (**)Under alternative name

Landmarks

The belfry, part of the City Hall, was inscribed on the UNESCO World Heritage List in 1999 as part of the Belfries of Belgium and France site.
The Maison Dorée was built in 1899 by Art Nouveau architect Alfred Frère. Its name is derived from the golden sgraffiti that adorn the façade.
The city is home to several museums of fine art, glass and other disciplines, as well as a significant one specializing in photography, in the Mont-sur-Marchienne district.
 In remembrance to the Jews of Charleroi being murdered by the Nazi regime, the German artist Gunter Demnig has collocated nine Stolpersteine in Charleroi.
 The Tour Bleue ("Blue Tower"), located in the centre of Charleroi and 75 m high. Realised in 2015 by Jean Nouvel, it is the headquarters of the Police.

Economy
The municipality contains an industrial area for electrical engineering and the production of iron, steel, glass and chemicals. The conglomerate ArcelorMittal subdivided its Industeel unit to encompass the Charleroi steelworks.

Charleroi is in the center of a coal basin. Even so, due to the widespread loss in industrial power in the area since the 1970s, the area suffered some of the highest unemployment and poverty rates in Europe for most of the 1980s and 1990s. However, from the early 2000s, the overall economy of the area has diversified to include health care, transportation and telecommunications. Nevertheless, the poverty rates are still significant.

Education
Charleroi is Belgium's biggest city without having its own university. In 1966 the University of Louvain began operations in Charleroi with three faculties on its UCLouvain Charleroi campus based in the city center and in Montignies-sur-Sambre, including the Louvain School of Management and, more recently, the Louvain School of Engineering, issuing Bachelor's and Master's degrees and conducting research. Other universities have since started operations in Charleroi, including the Universities of Namur, Mons and the Université libre de Bruxelles.

Primary and secondary schools 

Secondary schools include:
 Athénée Royal Jules Destrée
 Athénée Royal Orsini Dewerpe
 
 Athénée Royal Les Marlaires
 
 Athénée Royal Vauban
 Athénée Royal Yvonne Vieslet
 Centre Educatif Communal Secondaire — La Garenne
 Institut d'Enseignement Technique Secondaire de l’UT
 Institut Jean Jaurès de l’UT
 Centre Educatif Communal Secondaire de Couillet-Marcinelle
 Institut Provincial d’Enseignement Secondaire Paramédical La Samaritaine

Transport

Air
Later, it housed the Fairey aircraft-factory building.

Gosselies is now used as an alternate airport for Brussels. Low-cost carrier Ryanair is the largest airline to provide service there; others include Wizz Air, Jetairfly.  Seasonal holiday charters also use the airport.

A new terminal opened in January 2008, replacing a much smaller building which had exceeded capacity.

In October 2021, the 650m extension of the runway was officially opened, bringing it to a total length of 3200m.

Rail
Charleroi is connected by train to other Belgian major cities through the main Charleroi-South railway station. The city also has a secondary railway station, Charleroi-West, on the Charleroi-to-Ottignies line.

Public transport

Public transport is provided by TEC (Transport En Commun), the Walloon public transport service. The greater Charleroi region is served by bus lines and a light-rail Metro system, (Métro Léger de Charleroi). Part of the latter is famous for incorporating one of the few remnants of the Vicinal, the former Belgian national tramway network.

Charleroi Metro
The Charleroi Metro is equally famous for the parts of the system which were never built, partially built or fully completed but not opened. It was planned in the 1960s as a 48 km (30 mi.) light-rail network, operating on the heavy rail metro infrastructure, consisting of eight branch lines radiating from a central loop downtown. However, only one line (to Petria), part of another line (to Gilly) and three-quarters of the loop were actually built and opened to traffic, all from 1976 to 1996. Another branch line toward the suburb of Châtelet (Châtelineau) was almost fully built, to the extent of installing power cables, escalators and still-working electric signals in the first three stations but was never opened as passenger numbers would be too low to economically justify the extra staff. The high costs of construction, a decline in Charleroi's traditional "smokestack" industries and questioning of the scope of the whole project in proportion to the actual demand for it are cited as reasons for the original plan's becoming unfulfilled.

The central loop and the Gilly branch as far as Soleilmont were completed in 2012, with funds from the European Investment Bank. The Gosselies branch opened as a street-level tramline in 2013.  In June 2021 it was announced that €60m will be allocated to refurbish and open the long-ago completed but never served inner section of the Châtelet "ghost" line, and extend it to the new hospital development in the area. 

in June 2021, the new look of the first renovated tram is presented. This fleet-wide renovation of 22 million euro will end in 2026.

Culture

Museums 

 Musée de la photographie, in  Mont-sur-Marchienne
 BPS22, art Museum of the Province of Hainaut
 Bois du Cazier, in Marcinelle
 Musée des Beaux-Arts ("Museum of Fine Arts")

Theatres and dance hall 

 Charleroi Danses
 Théâtre de l'Ancre

Performance halls and cultural centers 

 Rockerill, alternative concert hall, exhibition space and performances located in Marchienne-au-Pont
 Vecteur, multidisciplinary cultural platform
 Eden, performance hall

Media 

 Éditions Dupuis, comic and magazines publisher located in Marcinelle
 Telesambre, regional television channel
 La Nouvelle Gazette, a Belgian French-language daily newspaper

Folklore events 

 Tour de la Madalaine, is both a religious procession and a folk march in Jumet
 The Climbias, a folk and charity club in Lodelinsart

 The Mardi Gras carnival with the release of the giants puppets
 The Easter and August fairs
 The Sunday market

Itineraries, tours 

 Boucle Noire ("Black Loop"), a 26 km walk between the industrial and natural landscape of Charleroi.

Sports

Charleroi is home to a number of champion teams in various sports. Spirou Charleroi in basketball has been an eight-times winner in the Basketball League Belgium. La Villette Charleroi in table tennis is the most successful club in the Champions League with five titles and has been the Belgian champion multiple times. Action 21 Charleroi in futsal has won one UEFA Futsal Cup and nine titles in the Belgian Division 1. In football, Royal Charleroi SC and ROC Charleroi have finished second in the Belgian Pro League. The 30,000-capacity Stade du Pays de Charleroi was a venue at UEFA Euro 2000.

Crime 
During the 1990s, Charleroi was notorious for violence, attributed to its high poverty and unemployment rates.

Marc Dutroux lived in Marcinelle, a suburb of Charleroi. 

On 6 August 2016, a man attacked two policewomen with a machete.

Notable people from Charleroi

Born in Charleroi
Léon Rosenfeld (1904-1974), physicist
Jean-Marie Andre, scientist
Pierre Carette, extreme-left terrorist
Alexandre Czerniatynski, football player
Jules Delhaize, 19th-century grocer and businessman, founder of what would become the Delhaize Group
Louis Delhaize, founder of the Louis Delhaize Group
Jules Destrée, lawyer and politician, born in Marcinelle, 19th century
Karel Erjavec, Slovenian lawyer and politician, Minister of Foreign Affairs; born in Aiseau
Paul Finet (1897-1965), Belgian politician, born in Montignies-sur-Sambre
Albert Frère, businessman and the richest person in Belgium
Régis Genaux, football player
Emile Grumieaux, painter, born in Gosselies
Paul-François Huart-Chapel, industrialist, 19th century
Jean-Pierre Lecocq (1947–1992), molecular biologist and entrepreneur
Georges Lemaître (1894–1966), priest, and astronomer, 20th century
Fabrice Lig, music producer, 20th century
Joseph Maréchal, Jesuit priest, philosopher, 20th century
Didier Matrige, painter and draughtsman, 20th century
Joëlle Milquet, politician, 20th century
Chantal Mouffe, political theorist, 20th century
François-Joseph Navez, painter, 18th century
Paul Pastur, lawyer and politician
Gaston Salmon (1878–1917) – épée fencer, Olympic champion
Marcel Thiry, poet, 19th century
Jeanne Toussaint (1887–1976), jeweller
Raymond Troye, wartime writer, 20th century
Annette Vande Gorne, composer
Fernand Verhaegen, painter and etcher, born in Marchienne-au-Pont, 19th century

Resided in Charleroi
Robert Arcq, writer
Paul Cuvelier, painter and comics artist
Muriel Degauque, suicide bomber in Iraq
Marc Dutroux, convicted child molester and serial killer
Arthur Grumiaux, violinist
René Magritte, painter
Johan Nunez, drummer for Nightrage/Firewind
Arthur Rimbaud, poet
Paul Verlaine, poet

Twin cities

 Hirson, France
 Saint-Junien, France
 Schramberg, Germany
 Waldkirch, Germany
 Manoppello, Italy
 Casarano, Italy
 Follonica, Italy
 Himeji, Japan
 Donetsk, Ukraine
 Pittsburgh, US
 Uşak, Turkey
 Alvdal, Norway
 Bjugn, Norway

See also

Aéropole Science Park
Dauphines Charleroi
ICDI affair
List of municipalities in Wallonia
Municipalities of Belgium
R. Charleroi S.C.
R.O.C. Charleroi

References

External links
-

Official web site
Unofficial history of tramways in Charleroi 
Urban adventurers explore and photograph an unused Métro line
"Welcome to Charleroi: Tourism trebles in the world's ugliest town" Scotsman newspaper, April 7, 2009

 
Cities in Wallonia
Sub-municipalities of Charleroi
Municipalities of Hainaut (province)
World Heritage Sites in Belgium
1666 establishments in the Holy Roman Empire
Vauban fortifications in Belgium